As Long as I Live may refer to:

 As Long as I Live (1946 film), a 1946 French-Italian drama film (French title: Tant que je vivrai)
 "As Long as I Live" (Arlen-Koehler song), a 1934 song composed by Harold Arlen, with lyrics by Ted Koehler
 "As Long as I Live" (George Jones song), a 1968 song by George Jones, written by Roy Acuff
 As Long As I Live Tour, a 2019 concert tour by Toni Braxton

See also
 As Long as I Love